Donald R. Hopkins (born September 25, 1941) is a Bahamian American physician, a MacArthur Fellow and is the Vice President and Director of Health Programs at The Carter Center.  He graduated from Morehouse College with a B.S., from the University of Chicago with a Doctor of Medicine, and from the Harvard School of Public Health with a Master of Public Health. He studied at the Institute of European Studies, University of Vienna.

Career
From 1984 to 1987, Hopkins was deputy director and acting director (1985) of the Centers for Disease Control and Prevention.  Thereafter, he was an assistant professor of tropical public health at Harvard School of Public Health.

He directed the Smallpox Eradication/Measles Control Program in Sierra Leone.

He has served as a consultant to the World Health Organization.

Throughout his career, Hopkins has received numerous awards, including the CDC Medal of Excellence, the Distinguished Service Medal of the U.S. Public Health Service, and a MacArthur Fellowship in 1995 for his leadership in the international campaign to eradicate Guinea worm disease. His book, Princes and Peasants: Smallpox in History was nominated for the Pulitzer Prize in 1983.

Dr. Hopkins was also elected to the Institute of Medicine of the National Academy of Sciences in 1987 and has been a member of the American Society of Tropical Medicine and Hygiene since 1965. He was elected a Fellow of the American Academy of Arts and Sciences in 1997, awarded the Medal of Honor of Public Health (Gold) by the country of Niger in 2004, and named a Champion of Public Health by Tulane University in 2005.  Hopkins currently serves on the board of directors for the MacArthur Foundation.

Works
"The Guinea Worm Eradication Effort: Lessons for the Future", Emerging Infectious Diseases, Volume 4 No. 1, January – March 1998
The eradication of infectious diseases: report of the Dahlem Workshop on the Eradication of Infectious Diseases, Editors Walter R. Dowdle, Donald R. Hopkins, John Wiley and Sons, 1998 
The greatest killer: smallpox in history, with a new introduction, University of Chicago Press, 2002,  in

References

External links
Profiles in Science:  Donald R. Hopkins, NY Times, April 22, 2013]

1941 births
Morehouse College alumni
Pritzker School of Medicine alumni
Harvard School of Public Health alumni
University of Vienna alumni
Centers for Disease Control and Prevention people
MacArthur Fellows
Knights of the National Order of Mali
Living people
Harvard University faculty
American public health doctors
American people of Bahamian descent
Fellows of the American Academy of Microbiology
Members of the National Academy of Medicine